Deçan is a town and  municipality in Kosovo. According to the 2011 census, the town of has 3,803 inhabitants, while the municipality has 40,019 inhabitants.

Geography 

Geographically, Deçan is located in the Accursed Mountains mountain region. It is surrounded by the Beleg Mountain.

History 

Deçan was first recorded in 1330 in the decrees known as the Dečani chrysobulls as being a village with a population of 89 households, consisting of 623 people. The village was one of many feudal holdings of the Visoki Dečani monastery. As part of their feudal obligations, the local population of Deçan provided labour and payment in products to the Visoki Dečani monastery. The chrysobulls listed that Visoki Dečani held such rights over 2,097 households of meropsi (dependent farmers-serfs), 266 Vlach households (pastoral communities) and 69 sokalniki (craftsmen) over a large area in southern Serbia, Kosovo, Montenegro and north Albania. In the charters of Deçan, there were several cases where a father had an Albanian name and his son would have a Serbian name. This has been interpreted as highlighting the process of slavicization in the region.

Following the migration of the Serbs in the 17th and 18th century, many ethnic Serbs who lived in Deçan left. The local Albanian population of Deçan who remained continued to guard the local Visoki Dečani monastery.

During the Kosovo War, Deçan was one of the strongholds of the Kosovo Liberation Army (KLA). The KLA regularly smuggled weapons from Albania across the border to Deçan and as a result, the area saw significant fighting between the KLA and Yugoslav army and police.  The town was one of the areas where armed attacks against Serbian police and military began. On August 1995 in one of the most serious incidents before the Kosovo War, the Serbian police stations was attacked and set on fire by an armed group.

Culture

The medieval Serbian Orthodox Visoki Dečani monastery stands around 2 km to the west of the town.

Notes

Sources

References

External links 

Municipality of DeçanOfficial Website

 
Deçan
Deçan